(1976) is a Japanese pink film in the nunsploitation genre starring pop singer Luna Takamura, directed by Masaru Konuma and produced by Nikkatsu. AllRovi reports of the film, "As Konuma is not one to pull political punches for the sake of lightweight erotic fluff, the film is far more pointed than the numerous European 'sexy nun' films it ostensibly resembles." Jasper Sharp calls it "a typically profane offering in the most peculiar of Nikkatsu's pornographic subgenres".

Synopsis
Young Runa/Luna entered a convent after losing her boyfriend to her sister Kumi. Her dream of a tranquil life at the convent is shattered when she is raped by the abbot and introduced to a life of torture and abuse. Leaving the convent, she returns to her sister and former boyfriend to exact revenge by snaring them in a bogus financial scheme to promote Christianity in Japan and then departing with their money and a lesbian lover from the convent.

Cast
 Luna Takamura as Runa/Luna
 Aoi Nakajima
 Kumi Taguchi as Kumi
 Roger Prince as the Abbot
 Yōko Azusa
 Shin Nakamaru

Availability
A region 1 DVD release of Cloistered Nun: Runa's Confession with English subtitles was released by KimStim on July 1, 2013.

References

Sources

External links 
 
 

1976 films
Films directed by Masaru Konuma
Films set in Japan
Nikkatsu films
Nunsploitation films
Nikkatsu Roman Porno
Pink films
1970s pornographic films
1970s exploitation films
1970s Japanese films